Planorbarius is a genus of air-breathing freshwater snails, aquatic pulmonate gastropod mollusks in the family Planorbidae, the ram's horn snails, or planorbids, which all have sinistral or left-coiling shells.

Species
Species within this genus include:
 † Planorbarius barettii (Sacco, 1886) 
 † Planorbarius borellii (Brusina, 1892) 
 Planorbarius corneus (Linnaeus, 1758)
 † Planorbarius cornu (Brongniart, 1810) 
 † Planorbarius cornucopia (Baily, 1858) 
 † Planorbarius crassus (Serres, 1844) 
 † Planorbarius garsdorfensis Schlickum & Strauch, 1979 
 † Planorbarius halavatsi Neubauer, Harzhauser, Kroh, Georgopoulou & Mandic, 2014 
 † Planorbarius heriacensis (Fontannes, 1876) 
 † Planorbarius incrassatus (Rambur, 1862) 
 † Planorbarius isseli (Sacco, 1886) 
 † Planorbarius mantelli (Dunker, 1848) 
 † Planorbarius margoi (Lörenthey, 1894) 
 Planorbarius metidjensis (Forbes, 1838)
 † Planorbarius philippei (Locard, 1883) 
 † Planorbarius praecorneus (Fischer & Tournouër, 1873) 
 † Planorbarius reticulatus Roshka, 1973 
 † Planorbarius romani (Jodot, 1958) 
 † Planorbarius royoi (Jodot, 1958) 
 † Planorbarius sansaniensis (Noulet, 1854) 
 † Planorbarius solidus (Thomä, 1845) 
 † Planorbarius striatus Roshka, 1973 
 † Planorbarius sulekianus (Brusina, 1874) 
 † Planorbarius thiollieri (Michaud, 1855) 
 † Planorbarius turkovici (Gorjanović-Kramberger, 1899) 
 † Planorbarius vezici (Brusina, 1897) 
 † Planorbarius villatoyensis (Jodot, 1958) 
Species brought into synonymy
 † Planorbarius borelli (Brusina, 1892): synonym of † Planorbarius borellii (Brusina, 1892) 
 † Planorbarius cornus (Brongniart, 1810): synonym of † Planorbarius cornu (Brongniart, 1810) 
 † Planorbarius grandis (Halaváts, 1903): synonym of † Planorbarius halavatsi Neubauer, Harzhauser, Kroh, Georgopoulou & Mandic, 2014
 † Planorbarius thiollierei (Michaud, 1855): synonym of † Planorbarius thiollieri (Michaud, 1855)

Description
All species within family Planorbidae have sinistral shells.

References

External links
 AnimalBase info at: 

Planorbidae
Taxa named by André Marie Constant Duméril